Loricaria clavipinna is a species of catfish in the family Loricariidae. It is native to South America, where it occurs in the Amazon River basin in Brazil and Peru. The species reaches 18 cm (7.1 inches) in standard length and is believed to be a facultative air-breather.

References 

Fish described in 1940
Loricariini